Muskrat v. United States, 219 U.S. 346 (1911), was a landmark United States Supreme Court case in which the Court delineated the authority of United States federal courts to hear certain kinds of cases under the Case or Controversy Clause of the United States Constitution.

Facts
In this case, Congress passed a statute permitting certain Native Americans to bring suits against the United States to determine the constitutionality of a law allocating tribal lands, and providing that Counsel for both sides were to be paid from the United States Treasury. Several cases were brought pursuant to this statute, including suits brought by David Muskrat and J. Henry Dick opposing the partition of Indian lands, and by another pair, William Brown and Levi B. Gritts, opposing a prohibition against the sale of certain Indian lands.

Result
The United States Supreme Court refused to allow the case to be heard, maintaining that, though the United States was named as a defendant, the case in question was not an actual controversy: rather, the statute was merely devised to test the constitutionality of a certain type of legislation, and the Court's ruling would be nothing more than an advisory opinion; therefore, it dismissed the suit for failing to present a "case or controversy", as required by Article III of the United States Constitution.

Later developments
Although this decision remains as valid case law, its effective precedent has been diminished by the Supreme Court's approval of the declaratory judgment act, which permits a party to seek a declaration of rights against another party, even where no affirmative relief (e.g. damages or an injunction) is being sought. In a declaratory judgment action, if under the facts as proved, there is some possibility of a future need for relief as among the parties, a declaratory judgment may be entered.

See also
List of United States Supreme Court cases, volume 219
Hayburn's Case, 2 U.S. 409 (1792)

References

External links

 

1911 in United States case law
United States Supreme Court cases
United States Supreme Court cases of the White Court
United States Constitution Article Three case law
United States Native American case law